Korean Open Access License (KOAL) is a copyleft license developed by IPLeft in South Korea based on South Korean law, which enable authors to give different kind of permission to others.

Types 
There are four types of license in KOAL 2.0:
 Permissive: No restriction on purpose of usage and derivative works. (known as Commercial-Derivative works in 1.0)
 NoCommercial: Cannot be used in for-profit purpose. No restriction on derivative works. (known as NoCommercial-Derivative works in 1.0)
 NoDerivatives: No restriction on purpose of usage. No derivative works allowed. (known as Commercial-NoDerivatives in 1.0)
 NoCommercial-NoDerivatives: Cannot be used in for-profit purpose. No derivative works allowed. (known as NoCommercial-NoDerivatives in 1.0)

External links 

 Korea Open Access License Homepage
 Simple description on licenses
 License text for KOAL 2.0 Permissive
 License text for KOAL 2.0 NoCommercial
 License text for KOAL 2.0 NoDerivative
 License text for KOAL 2.0 NoCommercial NoDerivative
 Explanation on license term

Copyleft
Law of South Korea
Free content licenses
Intellectual property activism
Intellectual property law